Éric Andre Fanis (born December 30, 1971) is a former St. Lucian footballer who represented the Saint Lucia national football team.

Playing career 
Fanis had a stint with the Caribbean Stars in the Canadian International Soccer League in 1995. During his tenure with the Stars he won the 1996/1997 CISL Indoor Championship. In 1997, he signed with Foresta Suceava in Romania, and appeared in 22 matches and recorded three goals for the club.

National team 
Fanis made his debut for the Saint Lucia national football team on March 5, 2000 in the 2010 FIFA World Cup qualification – CONCACAF First Round match against Suriname.

References 

1971 births
Living people
Saint Lucian footballers
Saint Lucia international footballers
Liga I players
Liga II players
Expatriate footballers in Romania
Association football forwards